Warship is a 1986 computer wargame designed by Gary Grigsby and published by Strategic Simulations. It covers naval conflict during the Pacific War.

In 1987, Grigsby followed Warship with Battle Cruiser, which reuses the gameplay system but expands the scope to cover both World War I and World War II.

Gameplay
Warship is a computer wargame that simulates Asiatic-Pacific Theater naval surface combat during World War II. It is set between 1941 and 1945, and focuses on the conflict between Imperial Japan and the United Kingdom, United States and Netherlands. The game contains a "construction kit" that allows the player to create custom scenarios.

Development
Warship was designed by Gary Grigsby and was released in 1986, the same year he launched Battle Group. It was published by Strategic Simulations, Inc.

Reception

Bob Proctor reviewed the game for Computer Gaming World, and stated that "there's not much wrong with this game. The subject may not be of interest to everyone but this game recreates the feel of nighttime surface combat better than any other game of any kind."

In a 1988 Page 6 survey of wargames for Atari computers, writer M. Evan Brooks found that Warships poor documentation limited its appeal to "to true naval aficionados and not to those with a marginal interest." In his similar 1989 computer wargame survey, J. L. Miller of Computer Play called the game "historically accurate and recommended for the naval buff."

Sequel
Gary Grigsby designed a sequel to Warship entitled Battle Cruiser (1987), which carries over large parts of Warships system but covers both World War II and World War I.

Reviews
Computer Gaming World - December 1991
 Casus Belli #44 (April 1988)

References

External links

Article in Tilt (French)
Article in Video Games & Computer Entertainment

1986 video games
Computer wargames
Naval video games
Pacific War video games
Ship simulation games
Strategic Simulations games
Turn-based strategy video games
Video games developed in the United States
Video games set in Papua New Guinea
Video games set in the Philippines
Video games set in the Solomon Islands
Video game level editors
World War II video games